Lukáš Bauer (born 18 August 1977) is a Czech cross-country skier who has competed since 1996.

Biography
On 17 February 2006 he won the Winter Olympics silver medal for the 15 km cross-country classical.

His best finish at the FIS Nordic World Ski Championships was second in the 15 km classic in 2009.

Bauer is son-in-law of another Czech skier Helena Balatková-Šikolová.

In season 2007–08 he was overall winner of the men's version of the Tour de Ski and FIS Cross-Country World Cup. In 2010, he again won the Tour de Ski in a dramatic come-from-behind victory over Norwegian skier Petter Northug.

Bauer finished with the bronze medal in the 15 km freestyle event at the 2010 Winter Olympics.

After a career in which he collected three Olympic and two World Championship medals, Bauer confirmed his retirement from competing for the Czech national team after the 2017 Nordic World Championships in Lahti, although he indicated that he would continue competing in long-distance races for his own team, which he had set up three years previously. In April 2019 he was named as the Visma Ski Classics Pro Team Director of the year for his work with his ED System Bauer Team. The following month, he was announced as head coach of the Polish men's cross-country ski team.

Cross-country skiing results
All results are sourced from the International Ski Federation (FIS).

Olympic Games
 3 medals – (1 silver, 2 bronze)

World Championships
 2 medals – (2 silver)

World Cup

Season titles
 2 titles – (1 overall, 1 distance)

Season standings

Individual podiums

18 victories – (11 , 7 ) 
38 podiums – (27 , 11 )

Team podiums

1 victory – (1 )
5 podiums – (4 , 1 )

References

 FIS Newsflash 161. 9 January 2008 article on Bauer's Tour de Ski win.
 Mvcr.cz April 2006 article detailing Bauer's relationship to Balatková-Šikolová

External links
 
  

1977 births
Living people
Czech male cross-country skiers
Czech sports coaches
Cross-country skiing coaches
Olympic cross-country skiers of the Czech Republic
Olympic silver medalists for the Czech Republic
Olympic bronze medalists for the Czech Republic
Olympic medalists in cross-country skiing
Cross-country skiers at the 1998 Winter Olympics
Cross-country skiers at the 2002 Winter Olympics
Cross-country skiers at the 2006 Winter Olympics
Cross-country skiers at the 2010 Winter Olympics
Cross-country skiers at the 2014 Winter Olympics
Medalists at the 2010 Winter Olympics
Medalists at the 2006 Winter Olympics
FIS Nordic World Ski Championships medalists in cross-country skiing
FIS Cross-Country World Cup champions
Tour de Ski skiers
Tour de Ski winners
People from Ostrov (Karlovy Vary District)
Sportspeople from the Karlovy Vary Region